A badminton tournament was held at the  1999 Southeast Asian Games in Hassanal Bolkiah Sports Complex, Bandar Seri Begawan from 8 to 14 August 1999. Both men and women competed in their own team, singles, and doubles events and together they competed in a mixed doubles event.

Medalists

Results

Men's team

Quarter-final

Semi-final

Final

Women's team

Semi-final

Final

Men's singles

Women's singles

Men's doubles

Women's doubles

Mixed doubles

Medal tally

References

Medal Tally
History of the SEA Games

1999
1999 in badminton
Badminton tournaments in Brunei
S